The men's football tournament at the 1994 Asian Games was held in Hiroshima, Japan from 1 to 16 October 1994.

Squads

Results
All times are Japan Standard Time (UTC+09:00)

Preliminary round

Group A

Group B

Group C

Group D

Knockout round

Quarterfinals

Semifinals

Bronze medal match

Gold medal match

Final standing

Results
 Results

References

External links
 RSSSF Men

Men